Nematabramis alestes is a species of cyprinid found in Zamboanga, Basilan, Palawan, and Busuanga in the Philippines. It belongs to the genus Nematabramis.

References

Fish described in 1907
Danios
Nematabramis
Fish of the Philippines